Daniel Giménez may refer to:

 Daniel Giménez (footballer, born 1977), Argentine footballer
Daniel Giménez Alcañiz (born 1984), Spanish football coach
 Daniel Giménez Cacho (born 1961), Spanish-born Mexican actor
 Dani Giménez (born 1983), Spanish footballer

See also
 Daniela Giménez (born 1992), Argentine Paralympic swimmer
 Daniel Jiménez (disambiguation)